Fashion Queens is an American fashion-based talk show that aired on Bravo. The series premiered on March 17, 2013, with a three-week trail run. Fashion Queens is hosted by Bevy Smith, Derek J, and Miss Lawrence. Derek J and Miss Lawrence both made several appearances on The Real Housewives of Atlanta. Following the series' three-week trial run in March 2013, the first season continued on April 14, 2013. The second season premiere on November 3, 2013, which coincided with the sixth season premiere of The Real Housewives of Atlanta.  Fashion Queens was filmed in New York City.

In April 2014, Bravo renewed Fashion Queens for a third season, which premiered on November 9, 2014.

On August 8, 2015, host Bevy Smith confirmed that the series had been cancelled.

Segments
 The Week in Fashion: Latest fashion news
 Reading Room: The hosts dissect celebrities' fashion
 Right or Ratchet: The hosts decide if celebrities' outfits are Right or Ratchet
 Giving Me Wife: Reviewing The Real Housewives fashion
 Style GPS: The hosts review fashion news from around the world
 Ask a Queen: The hosts answer questions from Instagram and Twitter
 Gag Award: The hosts give awards for their favorite fashion looks

Episodes

References

2010s American television talk shows
2013 American television series debuts
2015 American television series endings
English-language television shows
Television series by Sony Pictures Television
Television series by Embassy Row (production company)
Television series by Endemol
Bravo (American TV network) original programming
Television shows filmed in New York (state)